The 2018 Progressive Conservative Association of Nova Scotia leadership election took place on October 27, 2018, due to Jamie Baillie's announcement that he was stepping down as leader of the Progressive Conservative Association of Nova Scotia on November 1, 2017. Baillie was to remain in the position until a new leader was elected, however on January 24, 2018, he announced his resignation with immediate effect due to "allegations of inappropriate behaviour".

Unlike the system of delegated conventions previously used, this election was conducted on a One Member One Vote basis, weighted so that each electoral district being allocated 100 points, which were distributed proportionally according to each candidate's level of support.

Timeline
 November 1, 2017 - Jamie Baillie announces his resignation, effective upon the election of a new leader.
 November 19, 2017 - Tim Houston becomes the first candidate to officially enter the race.
 January 8, 2018 - John Lohr announced his bid for the leadership.
 January 24, 2018 - Baillie moves up his resignation, having it take effect immediately; Karla MacFarlane becomes interim leader.
 February 3, 2018 - Cecil Clarke announced his bid for the leadership.
 February 6, 2018 - Elizabeth Smith-McCrossin announced her bid for the leadership.
 February 8, 2018 - Julie Chaisson announced her bid for the leadership.
 August 13, 2018 - Deadline for candidates to submit nomination.
 October 27, 2018 - Leadership convention is held in Halifax.

Candidates

Julie Chaisson
Background
Candidate of Record in Chester-St. Margaret's (2017)
Date campaign launched: February 8, 2018
Campaign website: 
MLAs: 
Former MLAs: 
Federal politicians: 
Municipal politicians: 
Other prominent individuals:

Cecil Clarke

Background
Mayor of the Cape Breton Regional Municipality (2012-2020), Attorney General of Nova Scotia (2007-2009), Minister of Justice (2007-2009), Speaker of the House of Assembly (2006-2007), Minister of Energy (2003-2006), Minister of Economic Development (2003), MLA for Cape Breton North (2001-2011)
Date campaign launched: February 3, 2018
Campaign website: 
Supporters
MLAs: (3) Alfie MacLeod (Sydney River-Mira-Louisbourg 2006–Present, 1995–1998), Eddie Orrell (Northside-Westmount 2011–Present), Keith Bain (Victoria-The Lakes 2017–Present, 2006–2013)
Former MLAs: (9) Rollie Thornhill (Dartmouth South 1974–1993, Mayor of Dartmouth 1967–1973), Jon Carey (Kings West 1999–2003), Judy Streatch (Chester-St. Margaret's 2005–2009), Brooke Taylor (Colchester-Musquodoboit Valley 1993–2009), Bill Langille (Colchester North 1999–2006), Benoit Robichaud (Yarmouth 1967–1970), Billy Joe MacLean (Inverness South 1981–1988, Mayor of Port Hawkesbury 1994–2016), Ken Streatch (Bedford-Musquodoboit Valley 1978–1993), Peter Christie (Bedford 1999–2006, Mayor of Bedford 1988–1991).
Federal politicians: (3) MP Lisa Raitt (Milton 2008–Present, Deputy Leader of the Conservative Party of Canada 2017–Present), MP Gerald Keddy (South Shore—St. Margarets 1997–2015), Donald Oliver (Senator for South Shore 1990–2013).
Municipal politicians: (2) Almon Chisholm (Former Mayor of Port Hawkesbury), Gloria McCluskey (Former Mayor of Dartmouth 1992–1996)
Other prominent individuals: (5) MPP Lisa MacLeod (Nepean 2006–Present), Irvine Carvery (Candidate in Preston-Dartmouth, 2017), Laurie MacIntosh (Candidate in Sydney-Whitney Pier, 2017), Valerie White (Candidate in Bedford, 2017), Louie Piovesan (Candidate in Cape Breton Centre, 2017).

Tim Houston

Background
MLA for Pictou East (2013–Present)
Date campaign launched: November 19, 2017
Campaign website: 
Supporters
MLAs: (7) Pat Dunn (Pictou Centre 2013–Present, 2006–2009), Tim Halman (Dartmouth East 2017–Present), Brad Johns (Sackville-Beaver Bank 2017–Present), Barbara Adams (Cole Harbour-Eastern Passage 2017–Present), Kim Masland (Queens-Shelburne 2017–Present), Larry Harrison (Colchester-Musquodoboit Valley 2013–Present), Allan MacMaster (Inverness, 2009–Present)
Former MLAs: (5) Neil LeBlanc (Argyle 1998–2003, 1984–1993), John Leefe (Queens 1978–1999, Mayor of Queens Municipality 2000–2012), David Nantes (Cole Harbour 1978–1993), Bruce Holland (Timberlea-Prospect 1993–1998), Guy LeBlanc (Clare 1984–1993)
Federal politicians: (3) MP Peter MacKay (Central Nova 1997–2015, Deputy Leader of the Conservative Party of Canada 2004–2015), MP Peter McCreath (South Shore 1988–1993), Tom McInnis (Senator for Nova Scotia 2012–Present).
Municipal politicians: (1) Roger MacKay (Mayor of Westville 2008–Present)
Other prominent individuals: (16) Patricia Auchnie (Candidate in Eastern Shore, 2017) Norm Cormier (Candidate in Clare-Digby, 2017), John Giannakos (Candidate in Sackville-Cobequid, 2017), Sylvia Gillard (Candidate in Halifax Armdale, 2017), Keltie Jones (Candidate in Truro-Bible Hill-Millbrook-Salmon River, 2017) Paul Kimball (Candidate in Clayton Park West, 2017), Tim Kohoot (Candidate in Timberlea-Prospect, 2017), John A. MacDonald (Candidate in Hants East, 2017), Ray Mattie (Candidate in Antigonish, 2017), Dan McNaughton (Candidate in Waverley-Fall River-Beaver Bank, 2017), Chris Mont (Candidate in Cole Harbour-Portland Valley, 2017), Chris Palmer (Candidate in Kings West, 2017), John White (Candidate in Glace Bay, 2017), Rob Wolf (Candidate in Guysborough-Eastern Shore-Tracadie, 2017), Matthew Donahoe (Candidate in Halifax Needham, 2017), Travis Price (Candidate in Fairview-Clayton Park, 2013)

John Lohr

Background
MLA for Kings North (2013–Present)
Date campaign launched: January 8, 2018
Campaign website: 
Supporters
MLAs:
Former MLAs: (2) George Archibald (Kings North 1984–1999), David Morse (Kings South 1999–2009), 
Federal politicians: (2) MP Greg Kerr (West Nova 2008–2015, MLA for Annapolis West 1978–1993), Kelvin Ogilvie (Senator for Annapolis Valley-Hants 2009–2017)
Municipal politicians: 
Other prominent individuals: (5) Brian Pickings (Candidate in Lunenburg, 2013, 2017), Greg Frampton (Candidate in Dartmouth-Cole Harbour, 1999, Cole Harbour-Portland Valley, 2013), Janice Munroe-Dodge (Candidate in Hants West, 2017), Martha MacQuarrie (Candidate in Kings-Hants, 2019), Wanda Webber (Candidate in Dartmouth-Cole Harbour, 2008)

Elizabeth Smith-McCrossin
Background
MLA for Cumberland North (2017–Present)
Date campaign launched: February 6, 2018
Campaign website: 
Supporters
MLAs:
Former MLAs: (6) Roger Bacon (Premier 1990–1991, Cumberland East 1970–1993), Mary Ann McGrath (Halifax Clayton Park 1999–2003), Murray Scott (Cumberland South 1998–2010), Joel Matheson (Halifax Bedford Basin 1978–1993), Art Donahoe (Halifax Citadel 1978–1993)
Federal politicians: (2) MP Scott Armstrong (Cumberland—Colchester 2009–2015), MP George Cooper (Halifax 1979–1980)
Municipal politicians: 
Other prominent individuals: (2) Rob Batherson (Candidate in Halifax Citadel-Sable Island, 2017), Lloyd Jackson (Candidate in Cole Harbour-Eastern Passage, 2009, 2013)

Declined
 Barbara Adams – MLA for Cole Harbour-Eastern Passage (2017–Present)
 Keith Bain – MLA for Victoria-The Lakes (2017–present, 2006–2013)
 Rob Batherson – Candidate in Halifax Citadel-Sable Island (2017)
 Chris d'Entremont – Minister of Finance (2009), Minister of Community Services (2009), Minister of Health (2006-2009), Minister of Acadian Affairs (2003-2009), Minister of Agriculture and Fisheries (2003-2006), MLA for Argyle-Barrington (2003–present)
 Pat Dunn – MLA for Pictou Centre (2006-2009), (2013–Present)
Peter MacKay - Minister of Justice (2013-2015), Minister of National Defence (2007-2013), Minister of Foreign Affairs (2006-2007), Minister of the Atlantic Canada Opportunities Agency (2006-2010), MP for Central Nova (2004-2015), Deputy Leader of the Conservative Party of Canada 
Allan MacMaster – MLA for Inverness (2009–present)
 Tim Halman – MLA for Dartmouth East (2017–Present)
 Brad Johns – MLA for Sackville-Beaver Bank (2017–Present)
 Paul Kimball - Filmmaker, Candidate in Clayton Park West (2017)
 Karla MacFarlane – Leader of the Opposition (2018–present), Interim Leader of the Progressive Conservative Association of Nova Scotia (2018–present), MLA for Pictou West (2013–Present)
 Eddie Orrell – MLA for Northside-Westmount (2011–Present)
 Alana Paon – MLA for Cape Breton-Richmond (2017–present)

Debates

Results

Opinion polls

References

Political party leadership elections in Nova Scotia
Nova Scotia Progressive Conservative Association
2018 political party leadership elections